This is a list of minor planets named after people, both real and fictional.

Science

Astronomers

Amateur
340 Eduarda (Heinrich Eduard von Lade, German)
792 Metcalfia (Joel Hastings Metcalf, American)
828 Lindemannia (Adolph Friedrich Lindemann, German-British)
1955 McMath (Robert Raynolds McMath, American)
2602 Moore (Sir Patrick Moore)
3184 Raab (Herbert Raab, Austrian)
4143 Huziak (Richard Huziak, Canadian)
6822 Horálek (Petr Horálek, Czech)
9121 Stefanovalentini (Stefano Valentini, Italian)
12787 Abetadashi (Tadashi Abe, Japanese)
13624 Abeosamu (Osamu Abe, Japanese)
16217 Peterbroughton (Peter Broughton, Canadian)
23771 Emaitchar (Martin H. Robinson, British)
22406 Garyboyle (Gary Boyle, Canadian)
24898 Alanholmes (Alan W. Holmes, American)
29483 Boeker (Karolin Kleemann-Boeker and Andreas Boeker, German)
32622 Yuewaichun (Wai Chun Yue, Hongkonger)
35461 Mazzucato (Michele T. Mazzucato, Italian)
37729 Akiratakao (Akira Takao, Japanese)
49109 Agnesraab (Agnes Raab, Austrian)
60406 Albertosuci (Alberto Suci, Italian)
103422 Laurisirén (Lauri Sirén, Finnish)
117032 Davidlane (Dave Lane, Canadian)
144907 Whitehorne (Mary Lou Whitehorne, Canadian)
161693 Attilladanko (Attilla Danko, Canadian)
171153 Allanrahill (Allan Rahill, Canadian)
260235 Attwood (Randy Attwood, Canadian)
263906 Yuanfengfang (Fengfang Yuan, Chinese)

Professional
107 Camilla (Camille Flammarion; also Camilla, mythological Volscian queen)
162 Laurentia (Joseph Jean Pierre Laurent)
238 Hypatia (Hypatia)
281 Lucretia (Caroline Lucretia Herschel)
339 Dorothea (Dorothea Klumpke)
349 Dembowska (Ercole Dembowski)
366 Vincentina (Vincenzo Cerulli)
511 Davida (David Peck Todd)
676 Melitta (Philibert Jacques Melotte)
729 Watsonia (James Craig Watson)
761 Brendelia (Martin Brendel)
767 Bondia (William Cranch Bond and George Phillips Bond)
768 Struveana (Otto Wilhelm von Struve, Friedrich Georg Wilhelm von Struve and Karl Hermann Struve)
784 Pickeringia (Edward Charles Pickering and William Henry Pickering)
786 Bredichina (Fyodor Aleksandrovich Bredikhin)
806 Gyldenia (Hugo Gyldén)
818 Kapteynia  (Jacobus Kapteyn)
819 Barnardiana (Edward Emerson Barnard)
827 Wolfiana (Max Wolf)
834 Burnhamia (Sherburne Wesley Burnham)
854 Frostia (Edwin Brant Frost)
855 Newcombia (Simon Newcomb)
856 Backlunda (Oskar Backlund)
857 Glasenappia (Sergey Glazenap)
872 Holda (Edward S. Holden)
892 Seeligeria (Hugo von Seeliger)
914 Palisana (Johann Palisa)
993 Moultona (Forest Ray Moulton)
995 Sternberga (Pavel Shternberg)
999 Zachia (Franz Xaver, Baron von Zach)
1000 Piazzia (Giuseppe Piazzi, discoverer of the asteroid 1 Ceres)
1002 Olbersia (Heinrich Wilhelm Matthäus Olbers)
1004 Belopolskya (Aristarkh Belopolsky)
1021 Flammario (Camille Flammarion)
1024 Hale (George Ellery Hale)
1040 Klumpkea (Dorothea Klumpke)
1111 Reinmuthia (Karl Wilhelm Reinmuth)
1120 Cannonia (Annie Jump Cannon)
1123 Shapleya (Harlow Shapley)
1129 Neujmina (Grigory Neujmin)
1134 Kepler (Johannes Kepler)
1186 Turnera (Herbert Hall Turner)
1215 Boyer (Louis Boyer)
1239 Queteleta (Adolphe Quetelet)
1241 Dysona (Sir Frank Watson Dyson)
1303 Luthera (Karl Theodor Robert Luther)
1322 Coppernicus (Nicolaus Copernicus)
1412 Lagrula (Joanny-Philippe Lagrula)
1455 Mitchella (Maria Mitchell)
1501 Baade (Walter Baade)
1510 Charlois (Auguste Charlois)
1529 Oterma (Liisi Oterma)
1539 Borrelly (Alphonse Louis Nicolas Borrelly)
1551 Argelander (Friedrich Wilhelm Argelander)
1573 Väisälä (Yrjö Väisälä)
1578 Kirkwood (Daniel Kirkwood)
1591 Baize (Paul Baize)
1594 Danjon (André-Louis Danjon)
1600 Vyssotsky (Emma T. R. Williams Vyssotsky)
1601 Patry (André Patry)
1614 Goldschmidt (Hermann Mayer Salomon Goldschmidt)
1622 Chacornac (Jean Chacornac)
1637 Swings (Pol Swings)
1642 Hill (George William Hill)
1655 Comas Solà (Josep Comas Solá)
1686 De Sitter (Willem de Sitter)
1677 Tycho Brahe (Tycho Brahe)
1691 Oort (Jan Oort)
1693 Hertzsprung (Ejnar Hertzsprung)
1714 Sy (Frédéric Sy)
1741 Giclas (Henry L. Giclas)
1743 Schmidt (Bernhard Schmidt)
1745 Ferguson (James Ferguson)
1761 Edmondson (Frank K. Edmondson)
1766 Slipher (V. M. Slipher and E. C. Slipher)
1776 Kuiper (Gerard Kuiper)
1778 Alfvén (Hannes Olof Gösta Alfvén)
1780 Kippes (Otto Kippes)
1803 Zwicky (Fritz Zwicky)
1830 Pogson (Norman Robert Pogson)
1831 Nicholson (Seth Barnes Nicholson)
1832 Mrkos (Antonín Mrkos)
1846 Bengt (Bengt Strömgren)
1850 Kohoutek (Luboš Kohoutek)
1851 Lacroute (Pierre Lacroute French astronomer)
1877 Marsden (Brian G. Marsden)
1886 Lowell (Percival Lowell)
1896 Beer (Wilhelm Beer)
1913 Sekanina (Zdeněk Sekanina)
1940 Whipple (Fred Lawrence Whipple)
1965 van de Kamp (Peter van de Kamp)
1983 Bok (Bart Bok)
1995 Hajek (Tadeáš Hájek)
1998 Titius (Johann Daniel Titius)
1999 Hirayama (Kiyotsugu Hirayama)
2000 Herschel (William Herschel)
2003 Harding (Karl Ludwig Harding)
2005 Hencke (Karl Ludwig Hencke)
2012 Guo Shou-Jing (Guo Shoujing)
2018 Schuster (Hans-Emil Schuster)
2069 Hubble (Edwin Hubble)
2074 Shoemaker (Eugene Shoemaker)
2097 Galle (Johann Gottfried Galle)
2099 Öpik (Ernst Julius Öpik)
2126 Gerasimovich (Boris Gerasimovich)
2136 Jugta (Jay U. Gunter)
2165 Young (Charles Augustus Young)
2198 Ceplecha (Zdeněk Ceplecha)
2227 Otto Struve (Otto Struve)
2234 Schmadel (Lutz Schmadel)
2281 Biela (Wilhelm von Biela)
2308 Schilt (Jan Schilt)
2325 Chernykh (Lyudmila Ivanovna Chernykh and Nikolai Stepanovich Chernykh)
2383 Bradley (James Bradley)
2439 Ulugbek (Ulugh Beg)
2635 Huggins (William Huggins)
2646 Abetti (Antonio Abetti and Giorgio Abetti)
2650 Elinor (Elinor Gates, American astronomer)
2688 Halley (Edmond Halley)
2709 Sagan (Carl Sagan)
2751 Campbell (William Wallace Campbell)
2772 Dugan (Raymond Smith Dugan)
2780 Monnig (Oscar Monnig)
2801 Huygens (Christiaan Huygens)
2813 Zappalà (Vincenzo Zappalà)
2842 Unsöld (Albrecht Unsöld)
2849 Shklovskij (Iosif Shklovsky)
2874 Jim Young (James Whitney Young)
2875 Lagerkvist (Claes-Ingvar Lagerkvist)
2897 Ole Römer (Ole Rømer)
2900 Luboš Perek (Luboš Perek)
2917 Sawyer Hogg (Helen Battles Sawyer Hogg)
2996 Bowman (Fred N. Bowman)
3070 Aitken (Robert Grant Aitken)
3078 Horrocks (Jeremiah Horrocks)
3095 Omarkhayyam (Omar Khayyám)
3115 Baily (Francis Baily)
3116 Goodricke (John Goodricke)
3123 Dunham (David Waring Dunham)
3169 Ostro (Steven J. Ostro)
3174 Alcock (George Alcock)
3216 Harrington (Robert Sutton Harrington)
3236 Strand (Kaj Aage Gunnar Strand)
3255 Tholen (David J Tholen)
3267 Glo (Eleanor "Glo" Helin)
3277 Aaronson (Marc Aaronson)
3282 Spencer Jones (Harold Spencer Jones)
3299 Hall (Asaph Hall)
3337 Miloš (Miloš Tichý)
3449 Abell (George O. Abell)
3467 Bernheim (Robert Burnham Jr.)
3487 Edgeworth (Kenneth Edgeworth)
3506 French (Linda M. French)
3507 Vilas (Faith Vilas) 
3545 Gaffey (Michael James Gaffey American Geologist)
3549 Hapke (Bruce William Hapke)
3594 Scotti (James V. Scotti)
3673 Levy (David H. Levy)
3722 Urata (Takeshi Urata)
3808 Tempel (Ernst Wilhelm Leberecht Tempel)
3847 Šindel (Jan Šindel)
3866 Langley (Samuel Pierpont Langley)
3936 Elst (Eric Walter Elst)
3962 Valyaev (Tamara Mikhaylovna Smirnova)
3999 Aristarchus (Aristarchus of Samos)
4000 Hipparchus (Hipparchus)
4001 Ptolemaeus (Ptolemy)
4037 Ikeya (Kaoru Ikeya)
4062 Schiaparelli (Giovanni Schiaparelli)
4064 Marjorie (Marjorie Meinel)
4151 Alanhale (Alan Hale)
4169 Celsius (Anders Celsius)
4279 De Gasparis (Annibale de Gasparis)
4298 Jorgenúnez (Jorge Núnez, Spanish astronomer)
4364 Shkodrov (Vladimir Georgiev Shkodrov)
4549 Burkhardt (Gernot Burkhardt)
4567 Bečvář (Antonín Bečvář)
4587 Rees (Martin Rees, Baron Rees of Ludlow)
4593 Reipurth (Bo Reipurth, Danish astronomer)
4713 Steel (Duncan Steel)
4790 Petrpravec (Petr Pravec)
4859 Fraknoi (Andrew Fraknoi)
4866 Badillo (Fr. Victor L. Badillo, Jesuit astronomer and former director of the Manila Observatory)
5080 Oja (Tarmo Oja)
5100 Pasachoff (Jay Pasachoff)
5704 Schumacher (Heinrich Christian Schumacher)
5035 Swift (Lewis Swift)
5036 Tuttle (Horace Parnell Tuttle)
5392 Parker (Donald C. Parker)
5430 Luu (Jane Luu)
5655 Barney (Ida Barney)
5726 Rubin (Vera Rubin)
5757 Tichá (Jana Tichá)
5826 Bradstreet (David Bradstreet)
5943 Lovi (George Lovi, astronomical columnist and planetarium educator)
6006 Anaximandros (Anaximander)
6075 Zajtsev (Alexander L. Zaitsev)
6076 Plavec (Miroslav Plavec)
6391 Africano (John L. Africano)
6398 Timhunter (Tim Hunter)
6696 Eubanks (Marshall Eubanks)
6779 Perrine (Charles Dillon Perrine)
7086 Bopp (Thomas Bopp)
7291 Hyakutake (Yuji Hyakutake)
7359 Messier (Charles Messier)
7948 Whitaker (Ewen A. Whitaker)
8068 Vishnureddy (Vishnu Reddy Indian Astronomer)
8140 Hardersen (Paul Hardersen, American Astronomer/Planetary Scientist)
8216 Melosh (H. Jay Melosh)
8391 Kring (David A. Kring)
8408 Strom (Robert G. Strom)
8558 Hack (Margherita Hack)
8690 Swindle (Timothy D. Swindle)
8785 Boltwood (Paul Boltwood)
9122 Hunten (Donald M. Hunten)
9133 d'Arrest (Heinrich Louis d'Arrest)
9134 Encke (Johann Franz Encke)
9207 Petersmith (Peter H. Smith)
9494 Donici (Nicolae Donici, Romanian astronomer)
9531 Jean-Luc (Jean-Luc Margot)
10633 Akimasa (Akimasa Nakamura, Japanese astronomer)
10689 Pinillaalonso (Noemi Pinilla-Alonso, Spaniard astronomer/Planetary Scientist)
10950 Albertjansen (Albert Jansen, German astronomer)
10969 Perryman (Michael Perryman, British astronomer)
11156 Al-Khwarismi (Muḥammad ibn Mūsā al-Khwārizmī, Persian astronomer)
11577 Einasto (Jaan Einasto)
11695 Mattei (Janet Akyüz Mattei, Turkish-American astronomer)
11755 Paczynski (Bohdan Paczyński, Polish astronomer)
11762 Vogel (Hermann Carl Vogel)
12621 Alsufi (Abd al-Rahman al-Sufi / Azophi, Persian astronomer)
12742 Delisle (Joseph-Nicolas Delisle)
14124 Kamil (Kamil Hornoch)
14120 Espenak (Fred Espenak)
14322 Shakura (Nikolai Ivanovich Shakura)
14335 Alexosipov and 152217 Akosipov (Alexandr Kuzmich Osipov, Russian-Ukrainian astronomer)
14825 Fieber-Beyer (Sherry Fieber-Beyer, American Astronomer/Planetary Scientist)
15395 Rükl (Antonín Rükl)
15420 Aedouglass (Andrew Ellicott Douglass, American astronomer)
15467 Aflorsch (Alphonse Florsch, French astronomer)
15955 Johannesgmunden (John of Gmunden)
15963 Koeberl (Christian Koeberl)
16682 Donati (Giovanni Battista Donati)
18150 Lopez-Moreno (José J. Lopez-Moreno, Spanish astronomer)
19139 Apian (Peter Apian)
24988 Alainmilsztajn (Alain Milsztajn, French astronomer)
30785 Greeley (Ronald Greeley, American Planetary Geologist, Regents' Professor, Arizona State University Tempe, Arizona 
32200 Seiicyoshida (Seiichi Yoshida, Japanese astronomer)
36445 Smalley (Kyle E. Smalley)
68730 Straizys (Vytautas Straižys, Lithuanian astronomer, the founder of Vilnius photometric system)
72021 Yisunji (Yi, Sunji, Korean astronomer in the 15th century)
92893 Michaelperson (Michael Person, American astronomer)
95593 Azusienis (Algimantas Ažusienis, Lithuanian astronomer)
99503 Leewonchul (Lee, Wonchul, Korean astronomer)
106817 Yubangtaek (Yu, Bangtaek, Korean astronomer in the 13th century)
165347 Philplait (Phil Plait, American astronomer, known as TheBadAstronomer)
234750 Amymainzer (Amy Mainzer, American astronomer) 
260906 Robichon (Noël Robichon, French astronomer) 
347940 Jorgezuluaga (Jorge I. Zuluaga Callejas, Colombian astronomer)

Planetarium directors
4897 Tomhamilton (Thomas William Hamilton, American astronomer, author, and planetarium director)
9108 Toruyusa (Toru Yusa, Japanese planetarium director and comet chaser)
13123 Tyson (Neil deGrasse Tyson, American astronomer and planetarium director)
17601 Sheldonschafer (Sheldon Schafer, Professor of astronomy and Director of the Riverview Museum Planetarium, Peoria, IL)

Relatives of astronomers
42 Isis (Elizabeth Isis Pogson, daughter of the astronomer Norman Robert Pogson; also Ancient Egyptian goddess Isis)
87 Sylvia (Sylvie Petiaux-Hugo Flammarion, first wife of the astronomer Camille Flammarion; also Rhea Sylvia, the mythical mother of the twins Romulus and Remus)
153 Hilda (Hilda von Oppolzer, daughter of the astronomer Theodor von Oppolzer)
154 Bertha (Berthe Martin-Flammarion, sister of the astronomer Camille Flammarion)
1280 Baillauda (Jules Baillaud, son of the astronomer Benjamin Baillaud)
1563 Noël (Emanuel Arend, son of the astronomer Sylvain Julien Victor Arend)
 3664 Anneres (Anna Theresia ("Anneres") Schmadel, the wife of astronomer Lutz Schmadel)
 68109 Naomipasachoff (Naomi Pasachoff, a science writer and educator, and wife of astronomer Jay Pasachoff of Williams College 5100 Pasachoff)

Biologists
1991 Darwin (Charles Darwin, an English naturalist, geologist and biologist)
2496 Fernandus (Fernandus Payne, zoologist)
2766 Leeuwenhoek (Anton van Leeuwenhoek, pioneering cell biologist)
4804 Pasteur (Louis Pasteur, father of microbiology)
7412 Linnaeus (Carl Linnaeus, father of modern taxonomy)
8357 O'Connor (J. Dennis O'Connor, biological scientist and provost at the Smithsonian Institution)
9364 Clusius (Carolus Clusius, botanist)
15565 Benjaminsteele (Benjamin Steele, biologist)

Cartographers
4798 Mercator (Gerardus Mercator)
19139 Apian (Peter Apian)

Chemists
1449 Virtanen (Artturi Ilmari Virtanen)
2143 Jimarnold (James R. Arnold)
2638 Gadolin (Johan Gadolin)
2769 Mendeleev (Dmitri Mendeleev, father of the periodic table of the chemical elements)
3069 Heyrovský (Jaroslav Heyrovský)
3605 Davy (Humphry Davy)
3676 Hahn (Otto Hahn), father of nuclear chemistry
3899 Wichterle (Otto Wichterle)
4564 Clayton (Robert Clayton)
4674 Pauling (Linus Pauling)
4716 Urey (Harold Urey)
4856 Seaborg (Glenn T. Seaborg)
5697 Arrhenius (Svante Arrhenius)
6032 Nobel (Alfred Nobel)
6826 Lavoisier (Antoine Lavoisier)
9680 Molina (Mario Molina)
11967 Boyle (Robert Boyle)
12292 Dalton (John Dalton)

Computer scientists and programmers
9121 Stefanovalentini (Stefano Valentini)
9793 Torvalds (Linus Torvalds)
9882 Stallman (Richard M. Stallman)
21656 Knuth (Donald Knuth)
27433 Hylak (Benjamin Hylak)
90479 Donalek (Ciro Donalek)
132718 Kemény (John George Kemeny)
294727 Dennisritchie (Dennis Ritchie)
300909 Kenthompson (Ken Thompson)

Mathematicians
187 Lamberta (Johann Heinrich Lambert)
843 Nicolaia (Thorvald Nicolai Thiele)
1001 Gaussia (Carl Friedrich Gauss)
1005 Arago (François Arago)
1006 Lagrangea (Joseph Louis Lagrange)
1552 Bessel (Friedrich Bessel)
1858 Lobachevskij (Nikolai Lobachevsky)
1859 Kovalevskaya (Sofia Kovalevskaya)
1888 Zu Chong-Zhi (Zu Chongzhi)
1996 Adams (John Couch Adams)
1997 Leverrier (Urbain Le Verrier)
2002 Euler (Leonhard Euler)
2010 Chebyshev (Pafnuti Chebyshev)
2587 Gardner (Martin Gardner)
3251 Eratosthenes (Eratosthenes)
3600 Archimedes (Archimedes)
4283 Stöffler (Johannes Stöffler)
4354 Euclides (Euclid)
4628 Laplace (Pierre-Simon Laplace)
5956 d'Alembert (Jean le Rond d'Alembert)
6143 Pythagoras (Pythagoras)
6765 Fibonacci (Leonardo Fibonacci of Pisa)
7057 Al-Fārābī (Al-Farabi, scientist, cosmologist, mathematician and music scholar)
7058 Al-Ṭūsī (Sharaf al-Dīn al-Ṭūsī, Persian mathematician)
7655 Adamries (Adam Ries, German mathematician)
8128 Nicomachus(Nicomachus, ancient Greek mathematician)
9689 Freudenthal (Hans Freudenthal)
9936 Al-Biruni (Abū Rayḥān al-Bīrūnī, Persian mathematician)
9999 Wiles (Andrew Wiles)
11156 Al-Khwarismi (Muḥammad ibn Mūsā al-Khwārizmī, Persian mathematician)
12493 Minkowski (Hermann Minkowski)
14100 Weierstrass (Karl Weierstrass)
13498 Al Chwarizmi (Muḥammad ibn Mūsā al-Khwārizmī, Persian mathematician)
16765 Agnesi (Maria Gaetana Agnesi)
16856 Banach (Stefan Banach)
19139 Apian (Peter Apian)
27500 Mandelbrot (Benoît Mandelbrot)
27947 Emilemathieu (Émile Léonard Mathieu)
28516 Möbius (August Ferdinand Möbius)
29552 Chern (Shiing-Shen Chern)
38237 Roche (Édouard Roche)
50033 Perelman (Grigori Perelman)
59239 Alhazen (Abū ʿAlī al-Ḥasan ibn al-Ḥasan ibn al-Haytham, Arab Muslim scientist, mathematician, astronomer, and philosopher)

Physicists
697 Galilea (Galileo Galilei)
837 Schwarzschilda (Karl Schwarzschild)
1069 Planckia (Max Planck)
1565 Lemaitre (Georges Lemaître)
1979 Sakharov (Andrei Sakharov)
2001 Einstein (Albert Einstein)
2244 Tesla (Nikola Tesla)
2352 Kurchatov (Igor Kurchatov)
3069 Heyrovský (Jaroslav Heyrovský)
3581 Alvarez (Luis Alvarez)
3905 Doppler (Christian Doppler)
3948 Bohr (Niels Bohr)
3949 Mach (Ernst Mach)
4065 Meinel (Aden Meinel)
4530 Smoluchowski (Roman Smoluchowski)
5103 Diviš (Prokop Václav Diviš)
5224 Abbe (Ernst Abbe)
5668 Foucault (Léon Foucault)
6999 Meitner (Lise Meitner)
7000 Curie (Maria Skłodowska-Curie)
7279 Hagfors (Tor Hagfors)
7495 Feynman (Richard Feynman)
7672 Hawking (Stephen Hawking)
8000 Isaac Newton (Isaac Newton)
8103 Fermi (Enrico Fermi)
9253 Oberth (Hermann Oberth)
10506 Rydberg (Johannes Rydberg)
10979 Fristephenson (Professor F. Richard Stephenson)
11013 Kullander (Sven Kullander)
11063 Poynting (John Henry Poynting)
11150 Bragg (William Lawrence Bragg)
11349 Witten (Edward Witten)
11438 Zel'dovich (Yakov Borisovich Zel'dovich)
11451 Aarongolden (Aaron Golden, Irish astrophysicist)
11528 Mie (Gustav Mie)
11577 Einasto (Jaan Einasto)
11779 Zernike (Frits Zernike)
12301 Eötvös  (Loránd Eötvös)
12320 Loschmidt (Johann Josef Loschmidt)
12423 Slotin) (Louis Slotin)
12628 Ackworthorr (Mary Ackworth Orr, solar physicist)
12755 Balmer (Johann Jakob Balmer)
12759 Joule (James Prescott Joule)
12760 Maxwell (James Clerk Maxwell)
12766 Paschen (Friedrich Paschen)
12773 Lyman  (Theodore Lyman)
12774 Pfund  (August Herman Pfund)
12775 Brackett (Frederick Sumner Brackett)
13092 Schrödinger (Erwin Schrödinger)
13093 Wolfgangpauli (Wolfgang Pauli)
13149 Heisenberg (Werner Heisenberg)
13219 Cailletet (Louis Paul Cailletet)
13478 Fraunhofer (Joseph von Fraunhofer)
13531 Weizsäcker (Carl Friedrich von Weizsäcker)
13954 Born (Max Born)
14413 Geiger (Hans Geiger)
14468 Ottostern (Otto Stern)
16583 Oersted (Hans Christian Ørsted)
16761 Hertz (Heinrich Hertz)
17649 Brunorossi (Bruno Rossi)
18169 Amaldi (Edoardo Amaldi)
19126 Ottohahn (Otto Hahn), father of nuclear fission
19178 Walterbothe (Walther Bothe)
20081 Occhialini (Giuseppe Occhialini)
24988 Alainmilsztajn (Alain Milsztajn, French particle physicist)
29137 Alanboss, (Alan Boss, American astrophysicist)
29212 Zeeman (Pieter Zeeman)
30828 Bethe (Hans Bethe)
32809 Sommerfeld (Arnold Sommerfeld)
37582 Faraday (Michael Faraday)
48798 Penghuanwu (Peng Huanwu)
52337 Compton (Arthur Compton)
55753 Raman (C. V. Raman)
58215 von Klitzing (Klaus von Klitzing)
67085 Oppenheimer (J. Robert Oppenheimer)
163244 Matthewhill (Matthew E. Hill)
177770 Saulanwu (Sau Lan Wu)

Physiologists
1007 Pawlowia (Ivan Pavlov)
15262 Abderhalden (Emil Abderhalden)
117413 Ramonycajal (Santiago Ramón y Cajal)

Psychologists, psychiatrists, and psychoanalysts
635 Vundtia (Wilhelm Wundt)
4342 Freud (Sigmund Freud)
11040 Wundt (Wilhelm Wundt)
11041 Fechner (Gustav Fechner)
11299 Annafreud (Anna Freud)
11518 Jung (Carl Jung)
11519 Adler (Alfred Adler)
11520 Fromm (Erich Fromm)
11521 Erikson (Erik Homburger Erikson)
11582 Bleuler (Eugen Bleuler)
11584 Ferenczi (Sándor Ferenczi)

Space exploration
Astrobiologists
2410 Morrison (David Morrison)
9826 Ehrenfreund (Pascale Ehrenfreund)
12859 Marlamoore (Marla Moore)
Planetary scientists
2710 Veverka (Joseph Veverka)
4815 Anders (Edward Anders)
7231 Porco (Carolyn Porco)
8356 Wadhwa (Meenakshi Wadhwa, meteorite analyst)
13358 Revelle (Douglas ReVelle)
21774 O'Brien (David P. O'Brien)
133432 Sarahnoble (Sarah K. Noble)
274860 Emilylakdawalla (Emily Lakdawalla)
Rocket scientists
1590 Tsiolkovskaja (Konstantin Tsiolkovsky)
1855 Korolev (Sergei Korolev)
8062 Okhotsymskij (Dmitry Okhotsimsky)
9252 Goddard (Robert Goddard)
25143 Itokawa (Hideo Itokawa)
Soyuz 11 crew members:
1789 Dobrovolsky (Georgi Dobrovolski)
1790 Volkov (Vladislav Volkov)
1791 Patsayev (Viktor Patsayev)
Other USSR/Russian cosmonauts
1772 Gagarin (Yuri Gagarin, the first human in space)
1836 Komarov (Vladimir Komarov)
Apollo 11 crew members:
6469 Armstrong (Neil Armstrong)
6470 Aldrin ("Buzz" Aldrin)
6471 Collins (Michael Collins)
STS-51-L crew members:
3350 Scobee (Francis "Dick" Scobee)
3351 Smith (Michael J. Smith)
3352 McAuliffe (Christa McAuliffe)
3353 Jarvis (Gregory Jarvis)
3354 McNair (Ronald McNair)
3355 Onizuka (Ellison Onizuka)
3356 Resnik (Judith Resnik)
STS-107 crew members:
51823 Rickhusband (Rick Husband)
51824 Mikeanderson (Michael P. Anderson)
51825 Davidbrown (David M. Brown)
51826 Kalpanachawla (Kalpana Chawla)
51827 Laurelclark (Laurel B. Clark)
51828 Ilanramon (Ilan Ramon, first Israeli astronaut)
51829 Williemccool (William C. McCool)
Other American astronauts:
4763 Ride (Sally Ride)
7749 Jackschmitt (Harrison H. Schmitt)
12790 Cernan (Eugene Cernan)
13606 Bean (Alan Bean)
22442 Blaha (John E. Blaha)
Chinese astronauts:
9512 Feijunlong (Fei Junlong)
9517 Niehaisheng (Nie Haisheng)
21064 Yangliwei (Yang Liwei)
Other astronauts:
2552 Remek (Vladimír Remek, Czechoslovak cosmonaut)
9496 Ockels (Wubbo Ockels, Dutch astronaut)
14143 Hadfield (Chris Hadfield, Canadian astronaut)
15006 Samcristoforetti (Samantha Cristoforetti, Italian astronaut)
22901 Ivanbella (Ivan Bella, Slovak cosmonaut)
37627 Lucaparmitano (Luca Parmitano, Italian astronaut)
135268 Haigneré (Claudie and Jean-Pierre Haigneré, French astronauts)
374354 Pesquet (Thomas Pesquet, French astronaut)

Other scientists, engineers and inventors
335 Roberta (Carl Robert Osten-Sacken, entomologist)
742 Edisona (Thomas Edison, inventor)
775 Lumière (Auguste and Louis Lumière, cinematic pioneers)
777 Gutemberga (Johannes Gutenberg, pioneer printer)
2177 Oliver (Bernard M. Oliver, research scientist)
2243 Lönnrot (Elias Lönnrot, physician, philologist, botanist, compiler of Kalevala)
2784 Domeyko (Ignacy Domeyko, mineralogist)
2809 Vernadskij (Vladimir Vernadsky, mineralogist, pioneer geochemist)
3256 Daguerre (Louis Daguerre, photographic pioneer)
3313 Mendel (Gregor Mendel, father of genetics)
3701 Purkyně (Jan Evangelista Purkyně, physiologist)
4217 Engelhardt (Wolf von Engelhardt, geologist)
4565 Grossman (Lawrence Grossman, geochemist)
5102 Benfranklin (Benjamin Franklin, scientist)
5864 Montgolfier (Montgolfier brothers, hot air balloon pioneers)
5958 Barrande (Joachim Barrande, geologist and paleontologist)
6175 Cori (Carl Ferdinand Cori and Gerty Theresa Cori, biochemists)
7552 Sephton  (Mark Sephton, geochemist)
8373 Stephengould (Stephen Jay Gould, evolutionist and essayist)
9969 Braille (Louis Braille, inventor of braille)
10093 Diesel (Rudolf Diesel, inventor of the diesel engine).
13609 Lewicki (Chris Lewicki), spacecraft systems engineer
14345 Gritsevich (Maria Gritsevich, research scientist)
15465 Buchroeder (Richard A. Buchroeder, optical engineer)
16518 Akihikoito (Akihiko Ito, Japanese CCD astrophotographer)
20259 Alanhoffman (Alan Hoffman, pioneer in infrared detectors)
29227 Wegener (Alfred Wegener, geologist and meteorologist)
37683 Gustaveeiffel (Gustave Eiffel, a French civil engineer and architect)
44103 Aldana (Fernando Aldana Mayor, electrical engineer, professor and politician)
52270 Noamchomsky (Noam Chomsky, an American linguist, philosopher, cognitive scientist, historian, social critic, and political activist)
61404 Očenášek (Ludvík Očenášek, handyman who constructed a monoplane, a radial engine for airplanes, and two-stage rockets)
73079 Davidbaltimore (David Baltimore, Nobel Prize in Physiology or Medicine Laureate)
172850 Coppens (Yves Coppens, paleoanthropologist)

Monarchs and royalty
12 Victoria (officially named after the Roman goddess of victory, but also honours Queen Victoria)
45 Eugenia (Empress Eugénie), with its moon Petit-Prince in part for her son Napoléon Eugène, Prince Imperial
115 Thyra (Thyra, consort of King Gorm the Old of Denmark)
216 Kleopatra (Cleopatra VII of Egypt)
220 Stephania (Princess Stéphanie of Belgium)
295 Theresia (Maria Theresa Walburga Amalia Christina Empress consort of the Holy Roman Empire and Queen consort of Germany)
326 Tamara (Queen Tamar of Georgia)
344 Desiderata (Queen Desideria of Sweden and Norway)
359 Georgia (King George II of Great Britain)
392 Wilhelmina (Queen Wilhelmina of the Netherlands)
525 Adelaide (Queen Adelaide, consort of William IV of the United Kingdom)
545 Messalina (Messalina, Roman empress)
546 Herodias (Herodias, wife of Herod II and mother of Salome)
562 Salome (Salome, daughter of Herod II and Herodias)
598 Octavia (Octavia the Younger, sister of Augustus)
650 Amalasuntha (Amalasuntha, queen of the Ostrogoths)
653 Berenike (Berenice II, Egyptian queen)
689 Zita (Empress Zita of Bourbon-Parma)
816 Juliana (Queen Juliana of the Netherlands)
823 Sisigambis (Sisygambis, mother of Darius III of Persia)
831 Stateira (Stateira, wife of Artaxerxes II of Persia)
832 Karin (Karin Månsdotter, wife of Eric XIV of Sweden)
888 Parysatis (Parysatis, wife of Darius II of Persia)
911 Agamemnon (Agamemnon)
1068 Nofretete (Nefertiti)
1128 Astrid (Astrid of Sweden)
2436 Hatshepsut (Pharaoh Hatshepsut)
3362 Khufu (Pharaoh Khufu)
4414 Sesostris (Greek version of Senusret, name of four pharaohs)
4415 Echnaton (Pharaoh Akhenaten; German spelling of his name)
4416 Ramses (Pharaoh Ramses II)
4568 Menkaure (Pharaoh Menkaure)
4721 Atahualpa (Atahuallpa)
4846 Tuthmosis (Thutmose, name of four pharaohs)
4847 Amenhotep (Pharaoh Amenhotep IV)
4848 Tutenchamun (Pharaoh Tutankhamun)
4906 Seneferu (Pharaoh Sneferu)
5009 Sethos (Greek version of Seti, name of two pharaohs)
5010 Amenemhet (Amenemhet, name of four pharaohs)
5242 Kenreimonin (Empress Dowager Kenrei)
7117 Claudius (Emperor Claudius)
7207 Hammurabi (Hammurabi)
7208 Ashurbanipal (Ashurbanipal)
7209 Cyrus (Cyrus II of Persia)
7210 Darius (Darius I of Persia)
7211 Xerxes (Xerxes I of Persia)
7212 Artaxerxes (Artaxerxes II of Persia)
8740 Václav (Václav I, Duke of Bohemia)
10293 Pribina (Pribina, ruler of Nitrian Principality)
11014 Svätopluk (Svätopluk, ruler of Great Moravia)
16951 Carolus Quartus (Charles IV, Holy Roman Emperor and King of Bohemia)
18349 Dafydd (Dafydd ap Llywelyn, prince of Wales)
20969 Samo (Samo, ruler of Samo's Empire)
25340 Segoves (Segoves, Celtic duke)
44613 Rudolf (Rudolph II, Holy Roman Emperor, king of Bohemia and Hungary)
48844 Belloves (Belloves, Celtic duke)
53285 Mojmír (Mojmír I, ruler of Great Moravia)
151834 Mongkut (King Mongkut, or Rama IV, the king of Siam)
326290 Akhenaten (Akhenaten, a pharaoh of the 18th Dynasty of Egypt)

Nobility
17702 Kryštofharant (Kryštof Harant)

Politicians and statespeople
712 Boliviana (Simon Bolivar)
852 Wladilena (Vladimir Lenin)
886 Washingtonia (George Washington)
932 Hooveria and 1363 Herberta (Herbert Hoover)
944 Hidalgo (Miguel Hidalgo)
1569 Evita (Eva Perón, former First Lady of Argentina)
1841 Masaryk (Tomáš Garrigue Masaryk, 1st Czechoslovak president)
2351 O'Higgins (Bernardo O'Higgins, Chilean independence leader)
3571 Milanštefánik (Milan Rastislav Štefánik)
4317 Garibaldi (Giuseppe Garibaldi)
4927 O'Connell (Daniel O'Connell)
5102 Benfranklin (Benjamin Franklin)
7586 Bismarck (Otto von Bismarck)
9275 Persson (Jöran Persson)
11830 Jessenius (Jan Jessenius)
23238 Ocasio-Cortez (Alexandria Ocasio-Cortez) * Note: earned prior to election to U.S. House of Representatives
188693 Roosevelt (Theodore Roosevelt)

Teachers

High school/technical school teachers
3352 McAuliffe (Christa McAuliffe, high school teacher from New Hampshire, U.S.A.)
12787 Abetadashi (Tadashi Abe, high school teacher from Japan)
13241 Biyo (Josette Biyo, high school teacher from Iloilo, Philippines)
13928 Aaronrogers (Aaron Rogers, mathematics teacher from London, U.K.)
14158 Alananderson (Alan Anderson, middle school teacher from Florida, U.S.A.)
14684 Reyes (Cynthia L. Reyes, middle school teacher from Florida, U.S.A.)
16265 Lemay (Ron LeMay, high school teacher from Wisconsin, U.S.A.)
17225 Alanschorn (Alan Schorn, high school teacher from New York, U.S.A.)
20341 Alanstack (Alan Stack, high school teacher from New York, U.S.A.)
20342 Trinh (Jonathan Trinh, high school teacher from Texas, U.S.A.)
20574 Ochinero (Marcia Collin Ochinero, middle school teacher from Florida, U.S.A.)
21395 Albertofilho (Alberto Filho, a technical school teacher from Rio Grande Do Sul, Brasil)
21435 Aharon (Terri Aharon, high school teacher from New York, U.S.A.)
22619 Ajscheetz (A. J. Scheetz, high school teacher from Connecticut, U.S.A.)
22993 Aferrari (Andrew Ferrari, high school teacher from North Carolina, U.S.A.)
23017 Advincula (Rigoberto Advincula, high school teacher from Texas, U.S.A.)
23975 Akran (Erkan Akran, middle school teacher from Arkansas, U.S.A.)
24032 Aimeemcarthy (Aimee McCarthy, middle school teacher from Florida, U.S.A.)
24052 Nguyen (Thuy-Anh Nguyen, teacher at Challenger School in Sunnyvale, California, U.S.A.)
24238 Adkerson (Timothy Adkerson, high school teacher from Missouri, U.S.A.)
27286 Adedmondson (Adam Edmondson, high school teacher from Pennsylvania, U.S.A.)
27740 Obatomoyuki (Tomoyuki Oba, junior high school teacher and presenter at Geisei Observatory, Japan)
27748 Lee (Thomas Lee, middle school teacher from California, U.S.A)

College/University professors
6669 Obi (Shinya Obi, professor emeritus at the University of Tokyo and retired president of the University of the Air)
10051 Albee (Arden L. Albee, professor of geology and planetary sciences and dean of graduate studies at the California Institute of Technology)
15870 Oburka (Oto Oburka, professor at Brno University of Technology and founder of the Nicholas Copernicus Observatory)
153298 Paulmyers (PZ Myers,  American scientist and associate professor of biology at the University of Minnesota Morris (UMM).)

War heroes and veterans

World War II heroes and veterans
1793 Zoya (Zoya Kosmodemyanskaya)
1907 Rudneva (Evgeniya Rudneva)
2009 Voloshina (Vera Danilovna Voloshina, Russian partisan)
2132 Zhukov (Georgy Zhukov)
3348 Pokryshkin (Aleksandr Ivanovich Pokryshkin)
11572 Schindler (Oskar Schindler, rescuer of 1,200 Jewish people)
17038 Wake (Nancy Wake, who served as a British spy)
19384 Winton (Nicholas Winton, rescuer of 669 Jewish children)
99949 Miepgies (Miep Gies, hid Anne Frank during World War II and discovered and preserved Anne's diary after her arrest and deportation.

Other war heroes
1834 Palach (Jan Palach, Czech student who self-immolated in protest against Soviet occupation of his country)
20164 Janzajíc (Jan Zajíc, Czech student who self-immolated in protest against Soviet occupation of his country)

Children who died in war
2127 Tanya (Tanya Savicheva)
5535 Annefrank (Anne Frank)
50413 Petrginz (Petr Ginz, Jewish boy who was murdered in Auschwitz concentration camp)

Religion
89 Julia (Julia of Corsica, martyr and patron saint, 5th century)
127 Johanna (believed to be named after Joan of Arc)
330 Adalberta (Adalbert Merx, German theologian and orientalist)
898 Hildegard (Hildegard of Bingen, abbess, composer and polymath)
1840 Hus (John Huss, Czech Jan Hus, religious reformer)
5275 Zdislava (Zdislava Berka, in Czech Zdislava z Lemberka)
7100 Martin Luther (Martin Luther)
7256 Bonhoeffer (Dietrich Bonhoeffer)
8661 Ratzinger (Joseph Alois Ratzinger – Pope Benedict XVI)
20006 Albertus Magnus (Albertus Magnus, German theologian, philosopher and naturalist)

Explorers
54 Alexandra (Alexander von Humboldt, naturalist and explorer)
327 Columbia (Christopher Columbus)
853 Nansenia (Fridtjof Nansen, polar explorer)
876 Scott (Robert Falcon Scott, polar explorer)
1065 Amundsenia (Roald Amundsen, polar explorer)
2473 Heyerdahl (Thor Heyerdahl, explorer and writer)
2785 Sedov (Georgy Sedov, Arctic explorer)
3130 Hillary (Edmund Hillary, mountaineer [see Tenzing, below])
3357 Tolstikov (Yevgeny Tolstikov, polar explorer)
4055 Magellan (Ferdinand Magellan, circumnavigator)
6481 Tenzing (Tenzing Norgay, Sherpa [see Hillary, above])
6542 Jacquescousteau (Jacques-Yves Cousteau, marine explorer)
8291 Bingham (Hiram Bingham III, explorer)
15425 Welzl (Jan Welzl, Arctic explorer)
43806 Augustepiccard (Auguste Piccard, explorer)

Historians
879 Ricarda (Ricarda Huch)
3092 Herodotus (Herodotus)
3097 Tacitus (Tacitus)
5946 Hrozný (Bedřich Hrozný, archaeologist, orientalist and linguist)
6174 Polybius (Polybius)
6304 Josephus Flavius (Josephus)
16413 Abulghazi (Abulghazi Bahadur)
40444 Palacký (František Palacký)

Other social scientists
1861 Komenský (Jan Amos Komenský (Comenius), teacher of nations)
12838 Adamsmith (Adam Smith, social philosopher)
13916 Bernolák (Anton Bernolák, linguist)
40440 Dobrovský (Josef Dobrovský, linguist)

Philosophers
238 Hypatia (Hypatia of Alexandria)
423 Diotima (Diotima of Mantinea)
2431 Skovoroda (Hryhorii Skovoroda)
2755 Avicenna (Avicenna)
2807 Karl Marx (Karl Marx)
2940 Bacon (Francis Bacon)
2950 Rousseau (Jean-Jacques Rousseau)
5102 Benfranklin (Benjamin Franklin)
5148 Giordano (Giordano Bruno)
5329 Decaro (Mario De Caro)
5450 Sokrates (Socrates)
5451 Plato (Plato)
6001 Thales (Thales)
6123 Aristoteles (Aristotle)
6629 Kurtz (Paul Kurtz)
7009 Hume (David Hume)
7010 Locke (John Locke)
7012 Hobbes (Thomas Hobbes)
7014 Nietzsche (Friedrich Nietzsche)
7015 Schopenhauer (Arthur Schopenhauer)
7056 Kierkegaard (Søren Kierkegaard)
7083 Kant (Immanuel Kant)
7142 Spinoza (Baruch Spinoza)
7853 Confucius (Confucius)
7854 Laotse (Laozi)
8318 Averroes (Averroes or Ibn Rushd)
14845 Hegel (Georg Wilhelm Friedrich Hegel)
16561 Rawls (John Rawls)
15911 Davidgauthier (David Gauthier)
19730 Machiavelli (Niccolò Machiavelli)
21665 Frege (Gottlob Frege)
22356 Feyerabend (Paul Feyerabend)
48435 Jaspers (Karl Jaspers)
73687 Thomas Aquinas (Thomas Aquinas)
90481 Wollstonecraft (Mary Wollstonecraft)
100027 Hannaharendt (Hannah Arendt)

The arts

Literature

General authors
254 Augusta (Auguste von Littrow)
1931 Čapek (Karel Čapek)
2428 Kamenyar (Ivan Franko)
2616 Lesya (Lesya Ukrainka)
2681 Ostrovskij (Nikolai Ostrovsky)
3047 Goethe (Johann Wolfgang von Goethe)
3412 Kafka (Franz Kafka)
4112 Hrabal (Bohumil Hrabal)
5418 Joyce (James Joyce)
5535 Annefrank (Anne Frank)
5666 Rabelais (François Rabelais)
5676 Voltaire (Voltaire)
6984 Lewiscarroll (Lewis Carroll or Charles Dodgson)
7328 Casanova (Giacomo Casanova)
8315 Bajin (Bajin)
8379 Straczynski (J. Michael Straczynski)
8382 Mann (brothers Heinrich Mann and Thomas Mann)
13406 Sekora (Ondřej Sekora)
26314 Škvorecký (Josef Škvorecký)
40106 Erben (Karel Jaromír Erben)
44597 Thoreau (Henry David Thoreau)
79144 Cervantes (Miguel de Cervantes)
91007 Ianfleming (Ian Lancaster Fleming, creator of the character James Bond ("007"))
308306 Dainere (Dainere Anthoney)

Novelists
348 May (Karl May)
2362 Mark Twain (Mark Twain)
2448 Sholokhov (Mikhail Sholokhov)
2578 Saint-Exupéry (Antoine de Saint-Exupéry)
2625 Jack London (Jack London)
2675 Tolkien (J.R.R. Tolkien)
2817 Perec (Georges Perec)
3204 Lindgren (Astrid Lindgren)
3453 Dostoevsky (Fyodor Dostoevsky)
3479 Malaparte (Curzio Malaparte)
3628 Božněmcová (Božena Němcová)
3836 Lem (Stanisław Lem)
4124 Herriot (James Herriot)
4266 Waltari (Mika Waltari)
4370 Dickens (Charles Dickens)
4474 Proust (Marcel Proust)
4923 Clarke (Arthur C. Clarke)
5020 Asimov (Isaac Asimov)
5099 Iainbanks (Iain Banks)
6223 Dahl (Roald Dahl)
6440 Ransome (Arthur Ransome)
7016 Conandoyle (Arthur Conan Doyle)
7232 Nabokov (Vladimir Nabokov)
7390 Kundera (Milan Kundera)
7644 Cslewis (C. S. Lewis)
7758 Poulanderson (Poul Anderson)
9766 Bradbury (Ray Bradbury)
10177 Ellison (Harlan Ellison)
10251 Mulisch (Harry Mulisch)
10733 Georgesand (George Sand)
10930 Jinyong (Jinyong)
11020 Orwell (George Orwell)
11379 Flaubert (Gustave Flaubert)
12284 Pohl (Frederik Pohl)
17776 Troska (J. M. Troska)
25399 Vonnegut (Kurt Vonnegut)
25924 Douglasadams (Douglas Adams)
39415 Janeausten (Jane Austen)
39427 Charlottebrontë (Charlotte Brontë)
39428 Emilybrontë (Emily Brontë)
39429 Annebrontë (Anne Brontë)
77185 Cherryh (C. J. Cherryh)
127005 Pratchett (Terry Pratchett)
227641 Nothomb (Amélie Nothomb)

Poets
1875 Neruda (Jan Neruda)
2106 Hugo (Victor Hugo)
2208 Pushkin (Aleksandr Pushkin)
2222 Lermontov (Mikhail Lermontov)
2427 Kobzar (Taras Shevchenko)
2604 Marshak (Samuil Marshak)
3067 Akhmatova (Anna Akhmatova)
3112 Velimir (Velimir Khlebnikov)
4110 Keats (John Keats)
4369 Seifert (Jaroslav Seifert)
4635 Rimbaud (Arthur Rimbaud)
7855 Tagore (Rabindranath Tagore)
9495 Eminescu (Mihai Eminescu)
11306 Åkesson (Sonja Åkesson)
12163 Manilius (Marcus Manilius)
18624 Prévert (Jacques Prévert)
59830 Reynek (Bohuslav Reynek)
110288 Libai (Li Bai)
110289 Dufu (Du Fu)

Playwrights
496 Gryphia (Andreas Gryphius)
615 Roswitha (Hrotsvitha)
2930 Euripides (Euripides)
2985 Shakespeare (William Shakespeare)
2921 Sophocles (Sophocles)
2934 Aristophanes (Aristophanes)
3046 Molière (Molière, French playwright)
3079 Schiller (Friedrich Schiller, German playwright)
5696 Ibsen (Henrik Ibsen)

Satirists
2734 Hašek (Jaroslav Hašek)
3244 Petronius (Petronius)
3668 Ilfpetrov (Ilya Ilf and Evgeny Petrov)
15017 Cuppy (Will Cuppy)
15946 Satinský (Július Satinský)

Other
4049 Noragalʹ (Nora Galʹ, Russian translator)
12608 Aesop (Aesop, fabulist)

Visual arts
2730 Barks  (Carl Barks, cartoonist)
3001 Michelangelo (Michelangelo Buonarroti, painter and sculptor)
3246 Bidstrup  (Herluf Bidstrup, caricaturist)
3566 Levitan (Isaac Levitan, painter)
4426 Roerich (Nicholas Roerich, painter)
4457 van Gogh (Vincent van Gogh, painter)
4511 Rembrandt (Rembrandt van Rijn, painter)
4671 Drtikol (František Drtikol, photographer)
4691 Toyen, (Toyen), painter and graphic artist)
4942 Munroe (Randall Munroe, former NASA roboticist and cartoonist, creator of webcomic xkcd)
5055 Opekushin (Alexander Opekushin, sculptor)
5122 Mucha (Alfons Mucha, painter and graphic artist)
5363 Kupka (František Kupka, painter and graphic artist)
5800 Pollock (Jackson Pollock, painter)
6056 Donatello (Donatello, painter)
6584 Ludekpesek (Ludek Pesek, painter)
6592 Goya (Francisco Goya, painter)
6674 Cézanne (Paul Cézanne, painter)
6676 Monet (Claude Monet, painter)
6677 Renoir (Pierre-Auguste Renoir, painter)
6701 Warhol (Andy Warhol, artist)
6768 Mathiasbraun (Mathias Braun, also known as Matyáš Braun, sculptor and carver)
6769 Brokoff (Johann Brokoff, also known as Jan Brokoff, sculptor and carver)
7701 Zrzavý (Jan Zrzavý, painter)
7867 Burian (Zdeněk Burian, painter and book illustrator)
8236 Gainsborough (Thomas Gainsborough, landscape and portrait artist)
8237 Constable (John Constable, painter)
8240 Matisse (Henri Matisse, painter)
10189 Normanrockwell (Norman Rockwell, artist)
10218 Bierstadt (Albert Bierstadt, Landscape artist)
10343 Church (Frederick Edwin Church, painter)
10372 Moran (Thomas Moran, landscape artist)
10404 McCall (Robert T. McCall, space artist)
13227 Poor (Kim Poor, space artist)
13329 Davidhardy (David A. Hardy, space artist)
13330 Dondavis (Don Davis, astronomical artist)
13543 Butler (Chris Butler, space artist)
13562 Bobeggleton (Bob Eggleton, painter)
14976 Josefčapek (Josef Čapek, painter and writer)
17625 Joseflada (Josef Lada, painter)
17806 Adolfborn (Adolf Born, painter)
20364 Zdeněkmiler (Zdeněk Miler, animator and illustrator)
21501 Acevedo (Tony Acevedo, multimedia graphic designer)
29490 Myslbek (Josef Václav Myslbek, sculptor)
43724 Pechstein (Max Pechstein, painter)
43775 Tiepolo (Giovanni Battista Tiepolo, painter)
46280 Hollar (Václav Hollar, graphic artist and painter)
48434 Maxbeckmann (Max Beckmann, painter)
85411 Paulflora (Paul Flora, graphic artist)
98127 Vilgusová (Hedvika Vilgusová, painter and illustrator of books for children)
184878 Gotlib (Marcel Gottlieb, cartoonist)

Architects
3062 Wren (Christopher Wren)
5318 Dientzenhofer (Dientzenhofer family or architects, like Christoph Dientzenhofer and his son Kilian Ignaz Dientzenhofer)
6055 Brunelleschi (Filippo Brunelleschi)
6266 Letzel (Jan Letzel)
6550 Parléř (Peter Parler)
19129 Loos (Adolf Loos)
24666 Miesvanrohe (Ludwig Mies van der Rohe)
35233 Krčín (Jakub Krčín)

Classical music

Composers
734 Benda (Karel Bendl)
1034 Mozartia (Wolfgang Amadeus Mozart)
1059 Mussorgskia (Modest Mussorgsky)
1405 Sibelius (Jean Sibelius)
1814 Bach (member of Bach family, probably Johann Sebastian Bach)
1815 Beethoven (Ludwig van Beethoven)
1818 Brahms (Johannes Brahms)
2047 Smetana (Bedřich Smetana)
2055 Dvořák (Antonín Dvořák)
2073 Janáček (Leoš Janáček)
2205 Glinka (Mikhail Glinka)
2266 Tchaikovsky (Pyotr Ilyich Tchaikovsky)
2420 Čiurlionis (Mikalojus Konstantinas Čiurlionis)
2523 Ryba (Jakub Jan Ryba)
2669 Shostakovich (Dmitri Shostakovich)
3081 Martinůboh (Bohuslav Martinů)
3590 Holst (Gustav Holst)
3592 Nedbal (Oskar Nedbal)
3784 Chopin (Frédéric Chopin)
3826 Handel (George Frideric Handel)
3917 Franz Schubert (Franz Schubert)
3941 Haydn (Joseph Haydn)
3954 Mendelssohn (Felix Mendelssohn)
3955 Bruckner (Anton Bruckner)
3975 Verdi (Giuseppe Verdi)
3992 Wagner (Richard Wagner)
4003 Schumann (probably Robert Schumann)
4040 Purcell (Henry Purcell)
4079 Britten (Benjamin Britten)
4132 Bartók (Béla Bartók)
4134 Schütz (Heinrich Schütz)
4330 Vivaldi (Antonio Vivaldi)
4345 Rachmaninoff (Sergei Rachmaninoff)
4382 Stravinsky (Igor Stravinsky)
4406 Mahler (Gustav Mahler)
4492 Debussy (Claude Debussy)
4515 Khrennikov (Tikhon Khrennikov)
4527 Schoenberg (Arnold Schoenberg)
4528 Berg (Alban Berg)
4529 Webern (Anton Webern)
4532 Copland (Aaron Copland)
4534 Rimskij-Korsakov (Nikolai Rimsky-Korsakov)
4546 Franck (César Franck)
4559 Strauss (Johann Strauss family or Richard Strauss)
4579 Puccini (Giacomo Puccini)
4625 Shchedrin (Rodion Shchedrin)
4727 Ravel (Maurice Ravel)
4734 Rameau (Jean-Philippe Rameau)
4802 Khatchaturian (Aram Khatchaturian)
4818 Elgar (Edward Elgar)
4850 Palestrina (Giovanni Pierluigi da Palestrina)
4972 Pachelbel (Johann Pachelbel)
5004 Bruch (Max Bruch)
5063 Monteverdi (Claudio Monteverdi)
5157 Hindemith (Paul Hindemith)
5177 Hugowolf (Hugo Wolf)
5210 Saint-Saëns (Camille Saint-Saëns) 
6354 Vangelis (Vangelis Papathanassiou) 
6480 Scarlatti (Alessandro and Domenico Scarlatti)
6549 Skryabin (Alexander Scriabin)
6777 Balakirev (Mily Balakirev)
6780 Borodin (Alexander Borodin)
6798 Couperin (François Couperin) 
7622 Pergolesi (Giovanni Battista Pergolesi)
7624 Gluck (Christoph Willibald Gluck)
7625 Louisspohr (Louis Spohr)
7903 Albinoni (Tomaso Albinoni)
8181 Rossini (Gioacchino Rossini)
8249 Gershwin (George Gershwin)
8877 Rentaro (Taki Rentaro)
9438 Satie (Erik Satie)
9493 Enescu (George Enescu)
9912 Donizetti (Gaetano Donizetti)
9913 Humperdinck (Engelbert Humperdinck)
10055 Silcher (Friedrich Silcher)
10116 Robertfranz (Robert Franz)
10186 Albéniz (Isaac Albéniz, Spanish Catalan composer and pianist)
10820 Offenbach (Jacques Offenbach)
10875 Veracini (Francesco Maria Veracini)
11050 Messiaen (Olivier Messiaen)
11289 Frescobaldi (Girolamo Frescobaldi)
11530 d'Indy (Vincent d'Indy)
11899 Weill (Kurt Weill)
12782 Mauersberger (Brothers Rudolf and Erhard Mauersberger, composers and conductors)
:it:14403 de Machault (Guillaume de Machaut)
15808 Zelter (Carl Friedrich Zelter)
16590 Brunowalter (Bruno Walter, composer and conductor)
17509 Ikumadan (Ikuma Dan)
53159 Mysliveček (Josef Mysliveček)
69288 Berlioz (Hector Berlioz)
300128 Panditjasraj (Pandit Jasraj)

Conductors
5230 Asahina (Takashi Asahina)
6432 Temirkanov (Yuri Temirkanov)
11201 Talich (Václav Talich)
21801 Ančerl (Karel Ančerl)
21804 Václavneumann (Václav Neumann)
36226 Mackerras (Charles Mackerras)

Opera Singers
218 Bianca (Bertha Schwarz, stage name Bianca Bianchi)
5203 Pavarotti (Luciano Pavarotti)
6583 Destinn (Ema Destinnová, also known as Emmy Destinn)
18460 Pecková (Dagmar Pecková)
37573 Enricocaruso (Enrico Caruso)
260508 Alagna (Roberto Alagna)

Others
644 Cosima (Cosima Wagner, director of the Bayreuth Festival and wife of Richard Wagner)
677 Aaltje (Aaltje Noordewier-Reddingius, soprano)
5184 Cavaillé-Coll (Aristide Cavaillé-Coll, Organ builder)
8471 Obrant (Arkadij Efimovich Obrant, ballet-master, producer, and teacher-humanist)
9914 Obukhova (Nadezhda Andreevna Obukhova, soloist at the Bolshoj Theater and People's Artist of the U.S.S.R.)
11305 Ahlqvist (David Ahlqvist, Swedish artist, author, and musician)
33434 Scottmanley (Scott Manley)
58373 Albertoalonso (Alberto Alonso, Cuban choreographer and dance visionary)

Entertainment

Popular music
1889 Pakhmutova (Aleksandra Pakhmutova, composer)
2620 Santana (Carlos Santana, musician)
2644 Victor Jara (Víctor Jara, musician)
3738 Ots (Georg Ots, musician)
3834 Zappafrank (Frank Zappa, musician)
 8749 Beatles (The Beatles, band). In addition, there are four consecutively numbered minor planets named after the individual members of The Beatles:
4147 Lennon (John Lennon)
4148 McCartney (Paul McCartney)
4149 Harrison (George Harrison)
4150 Starr (Ringo Starr)
4305 Clapton (Eric Clapton, musician)
4422 Jarre (Maurice Jarre and Jean Michel Jarre, French composers)
4442 Garcia (Jerry Garcia, musician)
4738 Jimihendrix (Jimi Hendrix, musician)
4749 Ledzeppelin (Led Zeppelin, the UK band)
5656 Oldfield (Mike Oldfield, composer)
5892 Milesdavis  (Miles Davis, musician)
5945 Roachapproach (Steve Roach, musician)
6354 Vangelis (Vangelis Papathanassiou, composer)
6433 Enya (Enya, musician)
7226 Kryl (Karel Kryl, musician)
7707 Yes (Yes, band)
7934 Sinatra (Frank Sinatra, vocalist)
8249 Gershwin (George Gershwin, composer)
9179 Satchmo (Louis Armstrong, musician)
10313 Vanessa-Mae (Vanessa-Mae, musician)
12272 Geddylee (Geddy Lee, Canadian musician)
13644 Lynnanderson (Lynn Anderson, an American country music singer)
14024 Procol Harum (Procol Harum, band)
15092 Beegees (Bee Gees, band)
16155 Buddy (Buddy Holly, musician)
17059 Elvis (Elvis Presley, musician)
17473 Freddiemercury (Freddie Mercury, musician)
18132 Spector (Phil Spector, musician)
18125 Brianwilson (Brian Wilson, musician)
19155 Lifeson (Alex Lifeson, Canadian musician)
19367 Pink Floyd (Pink Floyd, band)
19383 Rolling Stones (Rolling Stones, band)
19398 Creedence (Creedence Clearwater Revival, band)
21891 Andreabocelli (Andrea Bocelli, tenor singer)
22521 ZZ Top (ZZ Top, band)
23469 Neilpeart (Neil Peart, Canadian musician)
23990 Springsteen (Bruce Springsteen, musician)
24997 Petergabriel (Peter Gabriel, musician)
28151 Markknopfler (Mark Knopfler, a Scottish composer)
40248 Yukikajiura (Yuki Kajiura, a Japanese composer)
40775 Kalafina (Kalafina, a Japanese vocal group). In addition, there are four minor planets named after the individual members and former member of Kalafina:
41199 Wakanaootaki (Wakana Ootaki)
42271 Keikokubota (Keiko Kubota)
44475 Hikarumasai (Hikaru Masai)
47466 Mayatoyoshima (Maya Toyoshima – former member)
41981 Yaobeina (Yao Beina, singer)
42522 Chuckberry (Chuck Berry, an American guitarist, singer and songwriter)
44016 Jimmypage (Jimmy Page, musician)
52344 Yehudimenuhin (Yehudi Menuhin, violist and conductor)
52665 Brianmay (Brian May, musician, a member of band Queen (band))
65769 Mahalia, (Mahalia Jackson, singer)
72801 Manzanera, (Phil Manzanera, musician)
72802 Wetton, (John Wetton, musician)
79896 Billhaley (Bill Haley, musician)
81947 Fripp (Robert Fripp, musician, leader of King Crimson)
81948 Eno (Brian Eno, musician)
90125 Chrissquire (Chris Squire, musician, a member of band Yes (band))
91287 Simon-Garfunkel (Simon and Garfunkel, band)
94291 Django (Django Reinhardt, musician)
110393 Rammstein (Rammstein, band)
144296 Steviewonder (Stevie Wonder, a blind American songwriter and singer)
242516 Lindseystirling (Lindsey Stirling, an American violinist)
243002 Lemmy (Ian "Lemmy" Kilmister, British rock musician, member of Hawkwind, The Head Cat, and Motörhead)
249516 Aretha (Aretha Franklin, musician)
250840 Motörhead (The British heavy metal group Motörhead)
257248 Chouchiehlun (Chou Chieh Lun, mostly referred to as Jay Chou, a Taiwanese musician and singer-songwriter)
274213 Satriani (Joe Satriani, guitarist)
292872 Anoushankar (Anoushka Shankar, a sitar musician)
327695 Yokoono (Yoko Ono, musician)
337044 Bobdylan (Bob Dylan, musician)
342843 Davidbowie (David Bowie, musician)
365443 Holiday (Billie Holiday, jazz musician)
495181 Rogerwaters (Roger Waters, musician, one of Pink Floyd founders)
495253 Hanszimmer (Hans Zimmer, a German composer)
10026 Sophiexeon (Sophie Xeon, a Scottish electronic producer)

Film, TV and Theatre
2374 Vladvysotskij, (Vladimir Vysotsky, singer, poet, writer, movie and theatre actor)
2816 Pien, (Armand Pien (1920–2003), Belgian TV weatherman)
3252 Johnny (Johnny Carson, Talk Show Host)
3768 Monroe (Marilyn Monroe, an American actress, model, and singer)
3998 Tezuka (Osamu Tezuka, pioneering Japanese comic artist and animator)
4238 Audrey (Audrey Hepburn, actress)
4495 Dassanowsky (Elfi Dassanowsky, Austrian-born singer, studio founder, producer)
4535 Adamcarolla (Adam Carolla, comedian, television and radio host)
4536 Drewpinsky (Drew Pinsky, television and radio host, actor)
4659 Roddenberry (Gene Roddenberry, Star Trek creator)
4864 Nimoy (Leonard Nimoy, of Star Trek fame)
4901 Ó Briain (Dara Ó Briain, comedian and science presenter)
5608 Olmos (Edward James Olmos, actor)
6318 Cronkite (Walter Cronkite, TV newsreader)
6377 Cagney (James Cagney, actor)
6546 Kaye (Danny Kaye, actor and comedian)
7032 Hitchcock (Alfred Hitchcock, film director)
7037 Davidlean (David Lean, film director)
7307 Takei (George Takei, actor)
8299 Téaleoni (Téa Leoni, actress)
8347 Lallaward (Lalla Ward, actress)
8353 Megryan (Meg Ryan, actress)
8664 Grigorijrichters (Grigorij Richters, film director and co-founder of Asteroid Day)
8883 Miyazakihayao (Hayao Miyazaki, animator)
9081 Hideakianno (Hideaki Anno, Japanese animator, film director and actor)
9341 Gracekelly (Grace Kelly, actress)
9342 Carygrant (Cary Grant, actor)
Monty Python members:
9617 Grahamchapman (Graham Chapman)
9618 Johncleese (John Cleese)
9619 Terrygilliam (Terry Gilliam)
9620 Ericidle (Eric Idle)
9621 Michaelpalin (Michael Palin)
9622 Terryjones (Terry Jones)
9974 Brody (Adrien Brody)
10221 Kubrick (Stanley Kubrick)
10378 Ingmarbergman (Ingmar Bergman, film director)
11333 Forman (Miloš Forman, film director)
11548 Jerrylewis (Jerry Lewis, comedian and actor)
12561 Howard (Ron Howard, actor, director, producer)
12562 Briangrazer (Brian Grazer, producer)
12818 Tomhanks (Tom Hanks, actor, producer)
12820 Robinwilliams (Robin Williams, actor, comedian)
13070 Seanconnery (Sean Connery, actor)
132904 Notkin (Geoffrey Notkin, TV science educator, film producer)
13441 Janmerlin (Jan Merlin, actor and author)
15131 Alanalda (Alan Alda, actor, director, screenwriter, author)
17023 Abbott (Bud Abbott, actor, producer, comedian)
17062 Bardot (Brigitte Bardot, a French former actress, singer and fashion model)
17744 Jodiefoster (Jodie Foster, actress)
19291 Karelzeman (Karel Zeman, film director)
19578 Kirkdouglas (Kirk Douglas, actor)
19695 Billnye (Bill Nye, TV science educator)
22903 Georgeclooney (George Clooney, actor)
25930 Spielberg (Steven Spielberg, American film director)
26733 Nanavisitor (Nana Visitor, actress)
26734 Terryfarrell (Terry Farrell, actress)
26858 Misterrogers (Fred Rogers, US children's television host)
27899 Letterman (David Letterman, talk show host)
29132 Bradpitt (Brad Pitt, actor)
28600 Georgelucas (George Lucas, the director of the films American Graffiti and Star Wars)
28980 Chowyunfat (Chow Yun-fat, actor)
31556 Shatner (William Shatner, actor)
38461 Jiřítrnka (Jiří Trnka, puppet maker and puppet-film director)
39557 Gielgud (John Gielgud, actor)
64291 Anglee (Ang Lee, film director)
68410 Nichols (Nichelle Nichols, actress)
71000 Hughdowns (Hugh Downs, Television and radio anchorman)
78453 Bullock (Sandra Bullock, an American actress and producer)
110026 Hamill (Mark Hamill, actor)
116939 Jonstewart (Jon Stewart, comedian and TV host)
132874 Latinovits (Zoltán Latinovits, actor)
133161 Ruttkai (Éva Ruttkai, actress)
166614 Zsazsa (Zsa Zsa Gábor, actress and socialite)
224693 Morganfreeman (Morgan Freeman, actor)
231307 Peterfalk (Peter Falk, actor)
261690 Jodorowsky (Alejandro Jodorowsky, Chilean-French filmmaker)
262876 Davidlynch (David Lynch, American filmmaker)
560354 Chrisnolan (Christopher Nolan, film director)

Sports

Olympic medalists
1740 Nurmi (Paavo Nurmi, middle- and long-distance runner)
5910 Zátopek (Emil Zátopek, long-distance runner)
8217 Dominikhašek (Dominik Hašek, ice hockey player)
9224 Železný (Jan Železný, javelin thrower)
26986 Čáslavská (Věra Čáslavská, gymnast)
128036 Rafaelnadal (Rafael Nadal Parera, tennis player)
151659 Egerszegi (Krisztina Egerszegi, swimmer)
175281 Kolonics (György Kolonics, canoeist)
230975 Rogerfederer (Roger Federer, tennis player)

Other sports
1909 Alekhin (Alexander Alekhine, chess world champion)
4538 Vishyanand (Viswanathan Anand, chess world champion)
2472 Bradman (Donald Bradman, cricketer)
3027 Shavarsh (Shavarsh Karapetyan, finswimmer)
5891 Gehrig (Lou Gehrig, baseball player)
6758 Jesseowens (Jesse Owens, athlete)
7835 Myroncope (Myron Cope, sportscaster and journalist)
10634 Pepibican (Josef Bican, called "Pepi", football player)
10675 Kharlamov (Valeri Kharlamov, hockey player)
12373 Lancearmstrong (Lance Armstrong, cyclist)
12413 Johnnyweir (Johnny Weir, figure skater)
12414 Bure (Pavel Bure, ice hockey player)
14282 Cruijff (Johan Cruijff, Dutch football player)
33179 Arsènewenger (Arsène Wenger, football manager)
78071 Vicent (Francesc Vicent, chess writer)
79647 Ballack (Michael Ballack, German footballer)
82656 Puskás (Ferenc Puskás, football player)
85386 Payton (Walter Payton, American football player)
90414 Karpov (Anatoly Karpov, chess world champion)
316020 Linshuhow (Jeremy Lin, basketball player)

Other entertainers
3163 Randi (James Randi, magician and skeptic)

Contest winners

Broadcom MASTERS
2015 winner
31641 Cevasco (Hannah Olivia Cevasco, a middle school student from California, U.S.A)

Discovery Channel Young Scientist Challenge
2001 winners
15155 Ahn (Ryan J. Ahn, a middle school student from Pennsylvania, U.S.A.)
15559 Abigailhines (Abigail M. Hines, a middle school student from Indiana, U.S.A.)
2002 winners
13434 Adamquade (Adam Robert Quade, a middle school student from Minnesota, U.S.A.)
2003 winners
19564 Ajburnetti (Anthony James Burnetti, a middle school student from Maryland, U.S.A.)
2004 winners
20503 Adamtazi (Adam Ryoma Tazi, a middle school student from Florida, U.S.A.)
2005 winners
21850 Abshir (Iftin Mohamed Abshir, a middle school student from Colorado, U.S.A.)
21933 Aaronrozon (Aaron Alexander Rozon, a middle school student from Hawaii, U.S.A.)
2006 winners
22638 Abdulla (Almas Ugurgizi Abdulla, a middle school student from Florida, U.S.A.)
22656 Aaronburrows (Aaron Phillip Burrows, a middle school student from Texas, U.S.A.)
22786 Willipete (William Garrett Pete, a middle school student from Minnesota, U.S.A.)
2007 winners
23768 Abu-Rmaileh (Muhammad Akef Abu-Rmaileh, a middle school student from Arkansas, U.S.A.)
23924 Premt (Prem Thottumkara, a middle school student from Illinois, U.S.A)

Intel International Science and Engineering Fair
2002 winners
10237 Adzic (Vladislav Adzic, high school student from New York, U.S.A.)
11685 Adamcurry (Adam Michael Curry, high school student from Colorado, U.S.A.)
11697 Estrella (Allan Noriel Estrella, high school student from Manila, Philippines)
12088 Macalintal (Jeric Valles Macalintal, high school student from Manila, Philippines)
12522 Rara (Prem Vilas Fortran Rara, high school student from Iligan, Philippines)
12553 Aaronritter (Aaron M. Ritter, high school student from Indiana, U.S.A.)
13241 Biyo (Josette Biyo, high school teacher from Iloilo, Philippines, former Executive Director of the Philippine Science High School System)
2003 winners
16999 Ajstewart (Andrew James Stewart, high school student from NSW, Australia)
17984 Ahantonioli (Alexandra Hope Antonioli, high school student from Montana, U.S.A.)
18084 Adamwohl (Adam Richard Wohl, high school student from North Dakota, U.S.A.)
18142 Adamsidman (Adam Daniel Sidman, high school student from Colorado, U.S.A.)
18796 Acosta (Iyen Abdon Acosta, high school student from Maryland, U.S.A.)
19444 Addicott (Charles Michael Addicott, high school student from Florida, U.S.A.)
19488 Abramcoley (Abram Levi Coley, high school student from Montana, U.S.A.)
21395 Albertofilho (Alberto Filho, a technical school teacher from Rio Grande Do Sul, Brasil)
2004 winners
20779 Xiajunchao (Junchao Xia, high school student from Shanghai, China)
20780 Chanyikhei (Chan Yik Hei, high school student from Hong Kong, China)
20813 Aakashshah (Aakash Shah, high school student from New Jersey, U.S.A.)
2005 winners
21483 Abdulrasool (Ameen Abdulrasool, high school student from Illinois, U.S.A.)
21712 Obaid (Sami Obaid, college student from Quebec, Canada.)
21758 Adrianveres (Adrian Veres, high school student from Quebec, Canada)
2006 winners
21400 Ahdout (Zimra Payvand Ahdout, high school student from New York, U.S.A.)
21623 Albertshieh (Albert David Shieh, high school student from Arizona, U.S.A.)
21725 Zhongyuechen (Zhong Yuechen, Middle School student from Beijing, China)
2007 winners
23113 Aaronhakim (Aaron Hakim, high school student from Ontario, Canada)
23238 Ocasio-Cortez (Alexandria Ocasio-Cortez, high school student from New York, U.S.A.)
23306 Adamfields (Adam Chaplin Fields, high school student from New York, U.S.A.)
2008 winners
24520 Abramson (Ronit Batya Roth Abramson, high school student from California, U.S.A.)
24346 Lehienphan (Le Hien Thi Phan, high school student from Georgia, U.S.A.)
2009 winners
25638 Ahissar (Shira Ahissar, high school student from Rehovot, Israel.)
25642 Adiseshan (Tara Anjali Adiseshan, high school student from Virginia, U.S.A.)
25677 Aaronenten (Aaron Christopher Enten, high school student from Florida, U.S.A.)
2010 winners
26386 Adelinacozma (Adelina Corina Cozma, high school student from Ontario, Canada)
26447 Akrishnan (Akash Krishnan, high school student from Oregon, U.S.A.)
26462 Albertcui (Albert Cui, high school student from Utah, U.S.A.)
26544 Ajjarapu (Avanthi Sai Ajjarapu, high school student from Iowa, U.S.A.)
26557 Aakritijain (Aakriti Jain, high school student from California, U.S.A.)
26737 Adambradley (Adam Bradley Halverson, high school student from South Dakota, U.S.A.)
26740 Camacho (Martin Ayalde Camacho, high school student from Minnesota, U.S.A.)
28400 Morgansinko (Morgan Walker Sinko, high school student from Texas. U.S.A.)
2011 winners
28167 Andrewkim (Andrew Wooyoung Kim, high school student from Georgia, U.S.A.)
28439 Miguelreyes (Miguel Arnold Silverio Reyes, high school student from Quezon City, Philippines)
28442 Nicholashuey (Nicholas Michael Huey, high school student from Missouri, U.S.A.)
28443 Crisara (Alexander Raymond Crisara, high school student from Texas, U.S.A.)
28444 Alexrabii (Jahan Rabii, high school student from Texas, U.S.A.)
28446 Davlantes (Christopher Joseph Davlantes, high school student from Florida, U.S.A.)
28447 Arjunmathur (Arjun Mathur, high school student from Florida, U.S.A.)
28449 Ericlau (Eric Lau, high school student from Georgia, U.S.A.)
28450 Saravolz (Sara Ellen Volz, high school student from Colorado, U.S.A.)
28451 Tylerhoward (Tyler Trettel Howard, high school student from Kansas, U.S.A.)
28452 Natkondamuri (Nathan Sai Kondamuri, high school student from Indiana, U.S.A.)
28453 Alexcecil (Alexander Michael Cecil, high school student from North Carolina, U.S.A.)
28511 Marggraff (Blake Christopher Marggraff, high school student from California, U.S.A.)
28538 Ruisong (Rui Song, high school student from Saskatchewan, Canada)
2014 winners
Justin Lafazan, (high school student from Syosset, New York) 
31460 Jongsowfei, (Faye Jong Sow Fei, high school student from Sarawak, Malaysia)

Intel Science Talent Search
 2002 Winners
16113 Ahmed (Tahir Ahmed, high school student from New York, U.S.A.)
16215 Venkatraman (Dheera Venkatraman, high school senior)
16214 Venkatachalam (Vivek Venkatachalam, high school senior)
16238 Chappe (Sean Chappe, high school teacher from New Jersey, U.S.A.)
 2003 Winners
15421 Adammalin (Adam Mikah Malin, a high school senior from New York, U.S.A.)
 2005 Winners
21411 Abifraeman (Abigail Ann Fraeman, a high school senior from Maryland, U.S.A.)
21413 Albertsao (Albert Tsao, a high school senior from Massachusetts, U.S.A.)
 2006 Winners
22551 Adamsolomon (Adam Ross Solomon, a high school senior from New York, U.S.A.)
 2008 Winners
24121 Achandran (Ashok Chandran, a high school senior from New York, U.S.A.)
 2009 Winners
25410 Abejar (Patrick Jeffrey Abejar, a high school senior from New York, U.S.A.)
25422 Abigreene (Abigail Sara Greene, a high school senior from New York, U.S.A.)
 2010 Winners
25966 Akhilmathew (Akhil Mathew, a high school senior from New Jersey, U.S.A.)
25979 Alansage (Alan Robert Sage, a high school senior from New York, U.S.A.)
27239 O'Dorney (Evan Michael O'Dorney, a high school senior from California, U.S.A.)
 2011 Winners
27072 Aggarwal (Amol Aggarwal, a high school senior from California, U.S.A.)
27257 Tang-Quan (David Tang-Quan, a high school senior from California, U.S.A)
 2012 Winners
26200 Van Doren (Benjamin Van Doren, a high school senior from New York, U.S.A.)

Editors and publishers
305 Gordonia (James Gordon Bennett Jr., publisher of the New York Herald)
6282 Edwelda (Edwin L. Aguirre and Imelda B. Joson, Filipino editors of Sky & Telescope)
Editors of the Japanese monthly astronomical magazine Gekkan Tenmon Guide:
9067 Katsuno (Gentaro Katsuno)
11928 Akimotohiro (Hiroyuki Akimoto)

Discoverers' relatives
2839 Annette (Annette Tombaugh, the discoverer's daughter)
3044 Saltykov (Nikita Saltykov, one of the discoverers' grandfathers)
10588 Adamcrandall (Adam Crandall Rees, the discoverer's stepson)
12848 Agostino (Agostino Boattini, the discoverer's father)
13691 Akie (Akie Asami, the discoverer's wife)
19524 Acaciacoleman (Acacia Coleman, the discoverer's granddaughter)
60001 Adélka (Adélka Kotková, the discoverer's daughter)

Others
83 Beatrix (Beatrice Portinari, immortalized in Dante's Divine Comedy)
156 Xanthippe (Xanthippe, wife of Socrates)
323 Brucia (Catherine Wolfe Bruce, astronomical philanthropist)
609 Fulvia (Fulvia, wife of Mark Antony)
719 Albert (Albert Salomon von Rothschild, banker and benefactor of the Vienna Observatory)
904 Rockefellia (John D. Rockefeller, philanthropist)
1038 Tuckia (Edward Tuck, philanthropist)
1462 Zamenhof (L. L. Zamenhof, father of Esperanto)
3018 Godiva (Lady Godiva)
3147 Samantha (Samantha Smith, peace activist)
4318 Baťa (Tomáš Baťa, founder of the Bata Shoes Company)
4487 Pocahontas (Pocahontas)
4987 Flamsteed (Ethelwin ("Win") Frances Flamsteed Moffatt, a direct descendant of the brother of John Flamsteed, the first Astronomer Royal of England)
6235 Burney (Venetia Burney, suggested the name "Pluto" for the planet discovered by Clyde Tombaugh in 1930)
7166 Kennedy (Malcolm Kennedy, secretary of the Astronomical Society of Glasgow)
19718 Albertjarvis (Albert G. Jarvis, inventor)
69275 Wiesenthal (Simon Wiesenthal, Nazi hunter)
80652 Albertoangela (Alberto Angela, Italian science writer)
241528 Tubman (Harriet Tubman, American abolitionist)
249521 Truth (Sojurner Truth, American abolitionist)
316201 Malala (Malala Yousafzai, a Pakistani activist for female education)

Fictional characters

Characters in classic fiction
92 Undina (Undine, heroine of the novella Undine by Friedrich de la Motte Fouqué)
171 Ophelia (Ophelia, love interest of Prince Hamlet in William Shakespeare’s Hamlet)
211 Isolda (Iseult, lover of the Arthurian knight Tristan)
264 Libussa (Libuše, mythical Bohemian prophetess)
588 Achilles (Achilles, Greek hero of the Iliad)
617 Patroclus (Patroclus, Greek hero of the Iliad)
624 Hektor (Hector, Trojan hero of the Iliad)
911 Agamemnon (Agamemnon, Greek hero of the Iliad)
1143 Odysseus (Odysseus, legendary king of Ithaca)
1172 Äneas (Aeneas, prince of Troy)
1966 Tristan (Arthurian knight)
2041 Lancelot (Arthurian knight)
2054 Gawain (Arthurian knight)
2082 Galahad (Arthurian knight)
2095 Parsifal (Arthurian knight)
2483 Guinevere (Guinevere, King Arthur's queen)
2597 Arthur (King Arthur, legendary king of England)
2598 Merlin (Merlin, wizard who helped King Arthur)
3102 Krok (Krok, mythical Bohemian duke, father of Libuše, Kazi and Teta)
3180 Morgan (Morgan le Fay, enchantress in Arthurian legend)
3552 Don Quixote (Don Quixote, hero of the novel Don Quixote de la Mancha by Miguel de Cervantes)
5797 Bivoj (Bivoj, mythical Bohemian hero)
7695 Přemysl (Přemysl the Ploughman, mythical founder of the Přemyslid dynasty)
9551 Kazi (Kazi, Bohemian mythical female healer)
9713 Oceax (Oceax, son of Nauplius of Euboea and brother of Palamedes)
10764 Rübezahl (Rübezahl, Czech Krakonoš, giant ruler of the Giant Mountains)
12927 Pinocchio (Pinocchio, a fictional character and the main protagonist of the children's novel The Adventures of Pinocchio (1883) by the Italian writer Carlo Collodi.
15374 Teta (Teta, mythical Bohemian prophetess)
24601 Valjean (Jean Valjean, protagonist of the novel Les Misérables by Victor Hugo)
38086 Beowulf (Beowulf)

Characters in modern fiction
1683 Castafiore (Bianca Castafiore, the diva in Hergé's The Adventures of Tintin)
2309 Mr. Spock (Mr. Spock, the famous Vulcan, by way of the discoverer's cat)
2521 Heidi (title character in Johanna Spyri's well-known book Heidi)
2991 Bilbo (Bilbo Baggins, hero of The Hobbit)
4512 Sinuhe (title hero of The Egyptian by Mika Waltari)
Characters created by Arthur Conan Doyle:
5048 Moriarty (Professor Moriarty, archenemy of Sherlock Holmes)
5049 Sherlock (Sherlock Holmes, detective)
5050 Doctorwatson (Doctor Watson, sidekick of Sherlock Holmes)
Characters created by Lewis Carroll in Alice in Wonderland:
6042 Cheshirecat (the Cheshire cat)
6735 Madhatter (the Mad Hatter)
6736 Marchare (the March Hare)
Fabulous beasts described or mentioned by Lewis Carroll in Jabberwocky:
7470 Jabberwock (the Jabberwock)
7796 Járacimrman (Jára Cimrman, a fictional Czech genius)
7896 Švejk (Josef Švejk, the good soldier)
9007 James Bond (James Bond, fictional spy created by Ian Fleming)
10160 Totoro (Totoro, character in the 1988 Japanese animated film My Neighbor Totoro)
12410 Donald Duck (Donald Duck, a funny animal cartoon character created in 1934 at Walt Disney Productions
12448 Mr. Tompkins (Mr. Tompkins, hero of science books by George Gamow)
12796 Kamenrider (Kamen Rider, Japanese hero created by Shotaro Ishinomori)
18610 Arthurdent (Arthur Dent, hapless protagonist in The Hitchhiker's Guide to the Galaxy series)
18996 Torasan (Tora-san, vagabond protagonist of the Otoko wa Tsurai yo film series)
20496 Jeník (Jeník, hero of Bedřich Smetana’s opera The Bartered Bride)
20497 Mařenka (Mařenka, hero of Bedřich Smetana’s opera The Bartered Bride)
Comic strip characters by Goscinny and Uderzo:
29401 Asterix (Asterix)
29402 Obelix (Obélix)
29471 Spejbl (Spejbl, popular puppet character created by Josef Skupa)
29472 Hurvínek (Hurvínek, son of Spejbl, popular puppet character created by Josef Skupa)
33377 Večerníček (Večerníček, animated character inviting Czech children to watch evening TV fairytale)
46737 Anpanman (hero of the Japanese Anpanman picture book series whose head is made of bread filled with sweet bean paste)
58345 Moomintroll (Moomintroll, hero of books by Tove Jansson)
98494 Marsupilami (Marsupilami, character created by André Franquin)
99942 Apophis (Apophis, character from sci-fi TV show Stargate SG-1)
Petit-Prince, moon of 45 Eugenia (The Little Prince, hero of book by Antoine de Saint-Exupéry)

See also
List of minor planets
List of exceptional asteroids
List of minor planets named after animals and plants
List of minor planets named after places
List of minor planets named after rivers
Meanings of minor planet names
Stars named after people
List of people with craters of the Moon named after them

References

Jet Propulsion Laboratory. "JPL Small-Body Database Browser" http://ssd.jpl.nasa.gov/sbdb.cgi (accessed 15 December 2012).
Kleť Observatory. "Kleť numbered minor planets" (9 May 2004). http://www.klet.org/names/ (accessed 12 May 2004).
Minor Planet Center. "Minor Planet Names: Alphabetical List" (21 April 2011). http://www.minorplanetcenter.org/iau/lists/MPNames.html (was updated 4 June 2011).
Royal Astronomical Society of Canada. "Asteroids with a Canadian Connection" http://www.rasc.ca/canadian-asteroids (accessed 25 September 2013).
Schmadel, Lutz D. Dictionary of Minor Planet Names (2nd ed.). Berlin; New York: Springer-Verlag, 1993.

Minor Planets
 
People
Lists of Solar System objects
minor planets
Planets